Mount McCormick is a mountain  southeast of Mount Ralph in the Ford Ranges of Marie Byrd Land, Antarctica. It was discovered and mapped by the United States Antarctic Service (1939–41), and was named by the Advisory Committee on Antarctic Names for W.S. McCormick, an airplane pilot with the Byrd Antarctic Expedition (1933–35).

References

Mountains of Marie Byrd Land